Donald Bruce Herrmann (born June 5, 1947) is a former American football wide receiver in the National Football League (NFL) who played for the New York Giants and the New Orleans Saints.  He played college football at Waynesburg College and was drafted in the fifteenth round of the 1969 NFL Draft.

Herrman grew up in Chatham Township, New Jersey and played football at Chatham High School, where he played as a running back on the school's football team  focused primarily on its running game, with Hermann never catching more than eight passes in a season in his high school career.

References

1947 births
Living people
Chatham High School (New Jersey) alumni
People from Chatham Township, New Jersey
Players of American football from Newark, New Jersey
Sportspeople from Morris County, New Jersey
American football wide receivers
New York Giants players
New Orleans Saints players